Diaethria clymena, the Cramer's eighty-eight, is a species of butterfly of the family Nymphalidae. It is found from Mexico to Peru and Brazil. It was discovered to science by Pieter Cramer, in a fascicle of De uitlandsche Kapellen, 1775.

Adults are black with a blue band on each wing. The underside is red and white with black stripes that look like an outlined number "89" or "98".

The larvae feed on Trema lamarckiana, Trema micrantha, and Theobroma.

Subspecies

Listed alphabetically.
D. c. aurelia (Guenée, 1872)
D. c. beleses (Godman & Salvin, 1889) (Panama)
D. c. bourcieri (Guenée, 1872) (Ecuador)
D. c. clymena (Guyana, Brazil (Amazonas))
D. c. colombiana (Viette, 1958) (Colombia)
D. c. consobrina (Guérin-Méneville, [1844]) (Colombia, Venezuela)
D. c. dodone (Guenée, 1872) (Colombia)
D. c. janeira (C. Felder, 1862) (Brazil (Rio de Janeiro, São Paulo), Paraguay)
D. c. juani Neild, 1996 (Venezuela, Trinidad)
D. c. marchalii (Guérin-Méneville, [1844])  (Nicaragua to Colombia)
D. c. meridionalis (Bates, 1864) (Brazil (Rio Grande do Sul, Santa Catarina))
D. c. peruviana (Guenée, 1872) (Peru, Bolivia, Ecuador)
D. c. seropina (Röber, 1924) (Brazil (Pará))

References

External links
Diaethria clymena, Butterfly Corner
Friday Fellow: Cramer's Eighty Eight at Earthling Nature
Butterflies of the Amazon and Andes: 88 butterfly, Learn About Butterflies

Biblidinae
Butterflies described in 1775
Fauna of Brazil
Nymphalidae of South America
Butterflies of Trinidad and Tobago
Taxa named by Pieter Cramer